, and its side story Noragami: Stray Stories, are manga written by Adachitoka. Noragami is currently serialized monthly in Monthly Shōnen Magazine. The story follows the god Yato, and his encounter with society. Noragami: Stray Stories is a non-serialized collection of short side stories, with two parts released as of February 15, 2019.

Noragami is currently released in 26 tankōbon volumes, and 25 volumes have been translated into English as of February 16, 2023. Noragami is also being translated into Italian, Brazilian Portuguese, French, and German, by respectively Panini Comics - Planet Manga, Pika Édition, and Egmont Manga. Noragami: Stray Stories has been released as a single volume in February 2013, and as an add-on to the limited edition version of volume 20 in February 2019.

Volume list

Chapters not yet in tankōbon format
 104. TBA

Noragami: Stray Stories

References

Noragami